Manuel de Adalid y Gamero (February 8, 1872 – March 29, 1947) was a Honduran composer. A native of Danlí, he also was an organist and conductor. He composed mainly musical miniatures, such as waltzes, mazurkas, and polkas. Later in his life he became a citizen of the United States.  His papers, including much music in autograph score, may today be found at Tulane University. He died in Tegucigalpa, Honduras on March 29, 1947. His final resting place can be found in his native city of Danli, in the old cemetery.

References
Papers at Tulane University
Manuel de Adalid y Gamero inventor del orquestrófono
Discography on Victor Records

1872 births
1947 deaths
Honduran composers
People from El Paraíso Department
Honduran conductors (music)
Honduran emigrants to the United States
Male composers
20th-century composers
20th-century conductors (music)
20th-century male musicians
Male conductors (music)